The European Society of Aesthetic Gynecology (E.S.A.G) is a teaching organization which aims at enhancing the knowledge of gynecological surgical techniques and concepts. The main aim of the society is to furnish its members with teaching surgical skills. On a yearly basis, the society sponsors meetings and workshops. The conference proceedings are published in journals.

References 

European medical and health organizations
Gynecological surgery
International medical associations of Europe